Huitzuco de los Figueroa   is one of the 81 municipalities of Guerrero, in south-western Mexico. The municipal seat lies at Huitzuco. The municipality covers an area of 921.9 km².

As of 2005, the municipality had a total population of 35,055.

References

 

Municipalities of Guerrero